Richard Schneider-Edenkoben (1899–1986) was a German screenwriter and film director.

Selected filmography
 The Big Attraction (1931)
 Signal in the Night (1937)

References

Bibliography
 Kreimeier, Klaus. The Ufa story: a history of Germany's greatest film company, 1918–1945. University of California Press, 1999.

External links

1899 births
1986 deaths
Film people from Rhineland-Palatinate
People from Edenkoben